John MacNeill may refer to:

 J. G. Swift MacNeill (1849–1926), Irish Protestant Nationalist politician and MP, and professor and author of law
 John Benjamin Macneill (1793–1880), Irish civil engineer
 John F. MacNeill (1870–1962), physician and political figure on Prince Edward Island
 Eoin MacNeill (John McNeill, 1867–1945), Irish scholar, Irish language enthusiast, nationalist, and politician
 John MacNeill, High Sheriff of Antrim in 1843 under Queen Victoria
 John MacNeill, mechanical engineer for the Florida Automatic Computer
 John MacNeill, football player, see list of Michigan State Spartans in the NFL Draft 
 John MacNeill, president of the Baptist World Alliance 1928–1934

See also

 John McNeill (disambiguation)
 John McNeil (disambiguation)